The 2021–22 SAFA Second Division (known as the ABC Motsepe League for sponsorship reasons) was the 24th season of the SAFA Second Division, the third tier for South African association football clubs, since its establishment in 1998. Due to the size of South Africa, the competition was split into nine divisions, one for each region. After the league stage of the regional competition was completed, the nine winning teams of each regional division entered the playoffs.

MM Platinum beat Magesi F.C. 1-0 in the final, with both teams earning promotion to the 2022–23 National First Division.

Regions

Gauteng

Stream B

Limpopo

Stream B

Western Cape

Stream A

References

SAFA Second Division seasons
2021–22 in South African soccer leagues